Boesenbergia is a genus of plants in the ginger family. It contains more than 70 species, native to China, the Indian Subcontinent, and Southeast Asia (Thailand, Malaysia, Philippines, Indonesia, etc.).

Species
Plants of the World Online currently includes:
Boesenbergia alba (K.Larsen & R.M.Sm.) Mood & L.M.Prince - Thailand
Boesenbergia albolutea (Baker) Schltr. - Andaman Islands
Boesenbergia albomaculata S.Q.Tong - Yunnan
 Boesenbergia albosanguinea (Ridl.) Loes.
Boesenbergia angustifolia (Hallier f.) Schltr. - Thailand, Sumatra
Boesenbergia apiculata (Valeton) Loes. in H.G.A.Engler - Kalimantan
Boesenbergia armeniaca Cowley - Brunei, Sabah
 Boesenbergia atropurpurea Mas Izzaty & Meekiong
 Boesenbergia aurantiaca R.M.Sm.
Boesenbergia baimaii Saensouk & K.Larsen - Thailand
Boesenbergia basispicata K.Larsen ex Sirirugsa - Thailand
Boesenbergia belalongensis A.D.Poulsen - Brunei
 Boesenbergia bella Mood & L.M.Prince
Boesenbergia bruneiana Cowley - Brunei
Boesenbergia burttiana R.M.Sm. - Sarawak
 Boesenbergia burttii (K.Larsen & Jenjitt.) Mood & L.M.Prince
Boesenbergia clivalis (Ridl.) Schltr. - Peninsular Malaysia
 Boesenbergia collinsii Mood & L.M.Prince
Boesenbergia cordata R.M.Sm. - Sarawak
Boesenbergia curtisii (Baker) Schltr. - Peninsular Malaysia, Thailand
Boesenbergia decus-silvae (Hallier f.) Ardiyani & Mood
Boesenbergia extensa (K.Schum.) Veldkamp & Mood
Boesenbergia flabellata S.Sakai & Nagam.  - Sarawak
Boesenbergia flava Holttum - Peninsular Malaysia
Boesenbergia flavoalba R.M.Sm. - Borneo
Boesenbergia flavorubra R.M.Sm. - Sabah, Sarawak
Boesenbergia gelatinosa K.Larsen - Thailand
Boesenbergia grandifolia (Valeton) Merr. - Borneo
Boesenbergia grandis R.M.Sm. - Sabah, Sarawak
Boesenbergia hirta (Ridl.) Merr. - Sarawak
Boesenbergia hosensis Cowley - Sarawak
Boesenbergia hutchinsonii B.L.Burtt & R.M.Sm. - Sarawak
Boesenbergia imbakensis S.Sakai & Nagam. - Sabah
 Boesenbergia isanensis Saensouk & P.Saensouk
Boesenbergia ischnosiphon S.Sakai & Nagam. - Sarawak
Boesenbergia islamii Yusof & M.A.Rahman - Bangladesh
Boesenbergia jangarunii Cowley - Brunei
Boesenbergia kenali C.K.Lim - Peninsular Malaysia
Boesenbergia kerbyi R.M.Sm. - Sarawak
 Boesenbergia kerrii Mood, L.M.Prince & Triboun
 Boesenbergia kingii Mood & L.M.Prince
Boesenbergia laevivaginata S.Sakai & Nagam. - Sabah, Sarawak
Boesenbergia lambirensis S.Sakai & Nagam. - Sarawak
 Boesenbergia laotica (Picheans. & Mokkamul) Mood & L.M.Prince
 Boesenbergia latilabra (Valeton) Veldkamp & Mood
 Boesenbergia latongensis Meekiong, Ipor & Ibrahim
Boesenbergia loerzingii (Valeton) K.Larsen ex M.F.Newman, Lhuillier & A.D.Poulsen - Sumatra
Boesenbergia longiflora (Wall.) Kuntze - Myanmar
Boesenbergia longipes (King & Prain ex Ridl.) Schltr. - Perak, Thailand
Boesenbergia longipetiolata (Ridl.) Merr. - Mindanao
Boesenbergia lysichitoides S.Sakai & Nagam. - Sarawak
Boesenbergia macropoda Merr. - Jolo
 Boesenbergia magna (R.M.Sm.) Veldkamp & Mood
Boesenbergia maxwellii Mood, L.M.Prince & Triboun - Myanmar, Thailand
 Boesenbergia meghalayensis Aishwarya & M.Sabu
Boesenbergia minor (Baker) Kuntze - Peninsular Malaysia
Boesenbergia ochroleuca (Ridl.) Schltr. - Thailand
Boesenbergia oligosperma (K.Schum.) R.M.Sm.  - Sarawak
Boesenbergia orbiculata R.M.Sm. - Brunei, Sarawak
Boesenbergia ornata (N.E.Br.) R.M.Sm. - Kalimantan
Boesenbergia parva (Ridl.) Merr. - Sarawak
Boesenbergia parvula (Wall. ex Baker) Kuntze - Myanmar, Thailand
 Boesenbergia pauciflora (R.M.Sm.) Veldkamp & Mood
Boesenbergia petiolata Sirirugsa - Thailand
 Boesenbergia phengklaii Mood
Boesenbergia plicata (Ridl.) Holttum - Myanmar, Thailand, Peninsular Malaysia
Boesenbergia prainiana (King ex Baker) Schltr. - Thailand, Peninsular Malaysia
Boesenbergia pulchella (Ridl.) Merr. - Sabah, Sarawak
Boesenbergia pulcherrima (Wall.) Kuntze - India, Thailand, Myanmar, Peninsular Malaysia – type species
 Boesenbergia purpureorubra Mood & L.M.Prince
 Boesenbergia putiana Mood & L.M.Prince
 Boesenbergia quangngaiensis N.S.Lý
Boesenbergia regalis Kharuk. & Tohdam - Thailand
Boesenbergia roseopunctata (Ridl.) I.M.Turner - Sumatra
Boesenbergia rotunda (L.) Mansf. - Yunnan, Indochina, Java, Malaysia, Sumatra, Andaman Islands; introduced into India and Sri Lanka
Boesenbergia rubrolutea (Baker) Kuntze - Assam
Boesenbergia siamensis (Gagnep.) Sirirugsa - Thailand
Boesenbergia siphonantha (King ex Baker) M.Sabu, Prasanthk. & Škornick. - Indochina
Boesenbergia stenophylla R.M.Sm. - Borneo
Boesenbergia striata (Valeton) Loes. in H.G.A.Engler - Kalimantan
Boesenbergia subulata S.Sakai & Nagam - Borneo
Boesenbergia tenuispicata K.Larsen - Thailand
Boesenbergia thailandica (K.Larsen) Mood & L.M.Prince 
Boesenbergia thorelii (Gagnep.) Loes. in H.G.A.Engler - Indochina
Boesenbergia tiliifolia (Baker) Kuntze - India, Assam
Boesenbergia tillandsiodes (Baker) Kuntze - India, Assam, Peninsular Malaysia
Boesenbergia trangensis K.Larsen - Thailand
Boesenbergia uniflora (K.Schum.) Ardiyani & Mood 
Boesenbergia urceoligena A.D.Poulsen - Brunei
Boesenbergia variegata R.M.Sm. - Sabah, Sarawak
Boesenbergia violacea (K.Larsen & Triboun) Mood & L.M.Prince 
Boesenbergia vittata (N.E.Br.) Loes. in H.G.A.Engler - Sumatra
Boesenbergia xiphostachya (Gagnep.) Loes. in H.G.A.Engler - Vietnam
Note: Boesenbergia fallax Loes. in H.G.A.Engler is a synonym of Zingiber fallax (Loes.) L.Bai, Juan Chen & N.H.Xia

References

External links

Zingiberoideae
Zingiberaceae genera